Adventure Island is an Australian television series for children which screened on the ABC from 11 September 1967 to 22 December 1972 (repeats of the 1969-1972 episodes ran from 1973–1976). It was jointly created by Godfrey Philipp, who produced the series, and actor-writer John Michael Howson, who also co-starred in the show. It typically aired from Monday to Friday and each story would stretch across a full week, reaching a resolution on Friday.

Adventure Island was a joint production of Godfrey Philipp Productions and the Australian Broadcasting Commission, pre-recorded on videotape at the ABC's studios in Ripponlea, Melbourne. It is believed to be the first program made by the ABC in collaboration with an outside production company. Production was usually five weeks ahead of broadcast. It was a pantomime-style series set in the kingdom of Diddley-Dum-Diddley. The show was hosted by Nancy Cato (a cousin of the noted author of the same name) from 1967 to 1968 (her final pre-recorded episodes aired at the beginning of 1969) and Sue Donovan from 1969 to 1972.

Characters
Regular characters included:
 Liza (Liz Harris)
 Clown (John-Michael Howson)
 Mrs Flower Potts (Brian Crossley)
 Percy Panda (Jack Manuel)
 Dodo Panda (1967–1969) (Marion Edward)
 Betty Bruin (Carole Walker)
 Smiling Jim (James Smillie)
 Baddies including Fester Fumble (Ernie Bourne), Miser Meanie (Colin McEwan (1967–1968), Robert Essex (1969–1972)), Captain Crook (Ernie Bourne), Giggles Goblin (Peter Homewood) and Squire Squeezum (Burt Cooper)

Other characters were played by guest artists such as Vivean Gray (playing Mother Sparkle, who became Mother Tinkle—more famously Mrs Jessup in The Sullivans and Mrs Mangle in Neighbours), Patsy King, Brian Hannan, Frank Rich, Mary Hardy, Angela O'Toole and Lindsay Edwards.

Pre-production
Following the May 1967 announcement of the imminent axing of the highly popular Independent Television System children's programme The Magic Circle Club, made in Melbourne at the ATV0 studios in Nunawading, the ABC immediately approached its producers with a proposal to immediately take over production of the show. This was very quickly thwarted when the 0-10 Network's then owner Reg Ansett refused to relinquish his network's rights to the show's name and premise, forcing Philipp and Howson to devise a lookalike.

Adventure Island'''s creation was credited to both Philipp and Howson, although Liz Harris recalls Howson verbalising the show's entire premise and setting, as well as naming all the characters, during a short promotional aeroplane flight in mid-1967.

Writing
Whereas on The Magic Circle Club Howson shared scriptwriting duties fairly equally with Peter Homewood and Max Bartlett, for Adventure Island Howson wrote most of the scripts, with others contributed by Peter Homewood. Howson also wrote four illustrated storybooks based on the show which were given a single limited print run. They quickly sold out and are now extremely rare.

1967–68
Nancy Cato was Adventure Island's first host during 1967–68. Cato had been forced to leave The Magic Circle Club dramatically in 1966 after an on-set accident, and she joined Adventure Island after her recovery.

Each show would begin with Cato in an enchanted wood (one of the show's few direct similarities with The Magic Circle Club). In early episodes, Nancy would sit down behind a tree-stump lectern on which was poised a magic book, open the book and begin to read the story. The story would be based on a place called Adventure Island and the residents of its town of Diddley-Dum-Diddley, and viewers would see the story played out by the characters themselves.

In later episodes, Nancy would begin the show by bantering with puppets Gussie Galah, Crispian Cockatoo and Matilda Mouse, then read from the book. At the conclusion of each chapter, Nancy would talk to a cat puppet, which was named Samson in a viewer competition early in the show's run.

1969-72
Sue Donovan took over the hosting role in 1969 after Cato's unexpected departure. The show's basic structure remained, but each episode instead began with a conversation with a talking house (Mister House, later named Serendipity House in a viewer competition) voiced by Jack Manuel and sometimes Ernie Bourne). Sue would then walk into the house where she would ad-lib with Crispian Cockatoo and Gracie Galah on Mondays, Wednesdays and Fridays, and with Maxie Mouse (Ernie Bourne) and a vertical waveform called Chi on Tuesdays and Thursdays. A chime would sound to indicate it was time for Sue to read the book.

Each show would close with Sue talking to Samson the cat, but on Fridays she would click her fingers and magically transport herself to Diddley-Dum-Diddley for a sitdown chat and a cup of tea with all the characters.

Premise
The show was highly moralistic with a strong "good over evil" motif in every story.

The scripted part of the show—a story serialised over five days, Monday to Friday—usually involved the inhabitants of Diddley-Dum-Diddley being set upon or tricked in some way by one or more of the "baddies". On many occasions the usually dimwitted Clown (with sawdust for a brain and an appalling memory) would save the day with his uncanny ability to see through disguises, a skill not possessed by the other residents of the town.

Some weeks' episodes would include no baddies at all, but instead centre around a visitor to Diddley-Dum-Diddley, often a relative of one of the characters, or a business-person or entrepreneur of some sort.

Concerned that some children may become upset by the mischief created by the baddies or the dilemmas faced by the Diddley-Dum-Diddleys, it was common at times of high drama for a cast member to remind the young audience that "it always turns out all right on Fridays".

The highly melodramatic, overplayed tone of the show was rooted in very traditional camp and pantomime traditions, and utilised a genre of light entertainment and humour appreciated by children for its simplicity and by adults for its escapism and sly nods.

Music
In true 'panto' style, music was an essential element of Adventure Island. Nearly every moment was accompanied by instrumental improvisation. Each episode contained two original songs relevant to the show's plot. The lyrics for these were typically written by the week's scriptwriter (either Howson or Homewood) and set to music by musical director Bruce Rowland. After Rowland departed the show in 1971 many of the songs he had written were reused in later episodes. Rowland found great fame and respect during the 1970s and 1980s in the field of movie soundtracks. His replacement was Alan Teak.

The songs were almost always pre-recorded on Thursdays, then pressed to acetate and given to the actors to take home and learn so they could be accurately lip-synched during taping. A notable exception to the pre-recording rule was John Michael Howson's outstanding and moving live-to-camera performance of A Clown Without A Smile in episode 1174 (one of only a handful of episodes that have survived).

Puppets
In each episode's unscripted segments, the hostess would converse with puppet characters. It was at these points in the show that viewer contributions (drawings, riddles, jokes, etc.) would be aired.

The puppets which appeared on Adventure Island were:

Gussie Galah, operated by Colin McEwan (1967–68)
Crispian Cockatoo, operated by Ernie Bourne (1967–72)
Matilda Mouse, operated by Marion Edward (1967–68)
Samson (cat), operated by Ernie Bourne (1967–72)
Gracie Galah, operated by Brian Crossley (1969–72)
Maxie Mouse, operated by Ernie Bourne (1969–72)

A female version of Samson, operated by Liz Harris, appeared for several weeks in 1971 when Ernie Bourne was forced to take a break for health reasons.

Gussie is probably the most notorious, but least remembered, puppet character on Adventure Island. A brilliant McEwan creation, his intensely squawking voice, disruptive manner and constant teasing of Nancy Cato took the hilarious whining of Leonardo de Fun Bird (from The Magic Circle Club) to a completely new level. When McEwan left the show, Gussie was replaced by a more cultured female galah, Gracie, who was slightly taller in stature.

Samson was a large hand puppet, similar to a muppet. All the other puppets were mechanical creations. The operator would pull down on a rod, either underneath or inside the body of the puppet, to open the mouth or beak. The show's puppets were constructed by Axel Axelrad, who was typically named in the credits simply as "Axel".

Magic
As in The Magic Circle Club all of the characters in Adventure Island, including the hostesses, possessed magic powers which they could call upon if the need arose. These were used sparingly, most likely because of technical difficulties in performing videotape drop-edits with the cumbersome videotape technology of the day.

Each Friday episode generally concluded with the hostess visiting Adventure Island and sitting with the characters to discuss the week's adventure. She would transport herself there by clicking her fingers.

Samson (the pussycat) was actually a magic cat who would be invisible until Monday afternoon's episode. To make him appear, the hostess would need to answer a question he would ask from "beyond". He would disappear again on Friday afternoons by sneezing.

Colour
No episodes of Adventure Island were produced in colour, since Australian TV was at that time broadcast in black-and-white, and there was evidently no plan to sell the program overseas. A popular belief by many viewers that the show was in colour could be attributed in large part to the brilliant sets which, for most of the show's run, were designed by Paul Cleveland.

Howson has said that in 1971 an American network expressed strong interest in the show and were only reluctant to make an offer due to its monochrome format. Howson proposed a solution to the ABC in which the entire five shows would be restaged on Tuesdays but this time filmed in colour—the cast and crew now totally familiar with the scripts, having performed them for the videotaped version on Sunday and Monday—but his proposal was met with total uninterest by the ABC and was never considered.

A brief piece of colour footage (actually an offcut from a 1972 ABC magazine show story on the show's closure) was aired for the first time in 1996 as part of an ABC 40th anniversary programme.

AwardsAdventure Island won the first TV Week Logie award in the newly established category of Best Children's Show in 1969 (for programmes broadcast in 1968).
In 1971, Sue Donovan won the Logie for Best Female Personality (Victoria).
For his contribution to Australian children's television, Godfrey Philipp won a special Logie award in 1973. (In 1979, Godfrey's programme Rainbow won a further Logie for Outstanding Contribution To Children's TV.)

Cancellation
The show's axing, announced in mid-1972, was highly controversial—not least because it was replaced by the American program Sesame Street—and an unprecedented flood of public protest ensued. A group of MPs headed by David Kennedy launched a "Save Adventure Island" campaign during which questions were asked in Parliament. However the campaign was unsuccessful and the final episode, number 1175, aired on 22 December 1972. Godfrey Philipp had been the mastermind behind the Australian Labor Party's successful "It's Time" campaign, which in 1972 brought about a change in government in Australia for the first time in 22 years, so the decision to cancel Adventure Island may have been politically rather than economically motivated.

In popular culture
The costume for Percy Panda was used in a semi-regular segment on the ABC comedy The Late Show titled Shirty, the slightly aggressive bear, a send-up of children's television, in which the Shirty character would commit various violent atrocities. In the final Shirty segment, it was revealed that the occupant of the bear suit was Russell Crowe as his character from Romper Stomper.

In the first episode of The Micallef Program, host Shaun Micallef introduces the supporting cast as being recycled from old ABC television programs, stating that viewers may recognise cast member Roz Hammond as "the horribly mutilated corpse from the final episode of Adventure Island. I think Clown is revealed as the psychopath in that one."

Archival remnants

Many of the early episodes of Adventure Island appear to no longer exist. However, a search of the National Archives of Australia reveals 998 listings of audiovisual archival material for the program, most of which appears to be complete episodes stored as black and white film recordings. Although quite a few were wiped there are at least 955 episodes that do exist. Most of which are later episodes.

The National Film & Sound Archivedatabase contains listings for six episodes, preserved on 16mm film and in video copies—one from 1967, one from 1971, and four consecutive episodes (1171–1174) from 1972, which are among the last to have been produced.

The fate of Adventure Island is consistent with that of many other ABC-TV programs from the same period. In the late 1970s ABC-TV management instituted a policy of "recycling" videotape as a cost-cutting measure and this was especially targeted at older programs made in B&W. All departments of ABC-TV were obliged to surrender tapes and as a result a large amount of historically significant videotaped programming from the 1960s and early 1970s was erased.

However, the closure of the Gore Hill studios in Sydney in 2002–03 uncovered large amounts of uncatalogued film and video footage, including many hours of live performance footage from GTK and material other programs long thought to have been lost, including 'missing' portions of The Aunty Jack Show and it is therefore possible that more material from Adventure Island may have survived.

The Performing Arts Collection at the Arts Centre Melbourne, holds a substantial number of costumes, props, photographs and related documents for the production, with the National Film and Sound Archive in Canberra also holding a substantial collection of production documentation and photographs relating to the show.

The Adventure Island storybook, from which Cato and Donovan read each day, is now part of the collection of Powerhouse Museum, Sydney. The donor, who was working at the ABC's Rippon Lea studios as a props staffer at the time, rescued the book from a dumpster where it had been discarded in 1988.

In Memoriam
Several cast members of Adventure Island'' have died in recent years.

 Colin McEwan - 22 August 2005 (64)
 Marion Edward
 Peter Homewood - 22 December 2008 (79, one day short of his 80th birthday)
 Ernie Bourne - 21 January 2009 (82)
 Brian Crossley - 8 September 2012 (85)

On 22 January 2009, the day after Ernie Bourne's death, the following notice appeared in Melbourne's Herald Sun newspaper:

BOURNE, Ernie - A dear, lovable and funny man who brightened the lives of children around Australia and his fellow Cast Members in the Magic Circle Club and Adventure Island. Goodbye Sir Jasper, farewell Fester Fumble and Samson.
- Flower, Clown, Percy, Betty, Lisa, Sue, Miser, Hep Cat, Marlena, Fredd and Feefee, Godfrey, Bruce and the Boys in the Band.

References

External links
 Adventureisland.com.au
 Adventure Island Collection, in the Performing Arts Collection, at Arts Centre Melbourne.
 Adventure Island at the National Film and Sound Archive
 Adventure Island Opening with Sue Donovan 1970 on Youtube
 'Godfry Philipp and Adventure Island: Interview with Liz Harris (Liza) and Beth Spencer' (audio), Life Matters, ABC Radio National, Thursday 23 June 2011.
 The Magic Man: vale, Godfrey Philipp, long live Adventure Island, Beth Spencer, ABC The Drum, 23 Jun 2011.

Australian children's television series
Australian Broadcasting Corporation original programming
1967 Australian television series debuts
1972 Australian television series endings
Black-and-white Australian television shows
Australian television shows featuring puppetry
Australian preschool education television series